The National Library Service of Botswana is the legal deposit and copyright library for Botswana. It was officially opened on April 8, 1968. They strive to be a world class library and information hub. The library is considered one of the most centralized in the world, as it is responsible for the professional development for all libraries within Botswana, including academic ones.

History 
Being established in September 1967 through the Act of the Botswana National Assembly. President Sir Seretse Khama, the first President of the Republic of Botswana, officially opened the service on April 8, 1968. It was one of seven departments of the Ministry of Labour and Home Affairs. Its mission has been to preserve the national literary heritage and to provide the public with informational and educational services.

According to the United Nations, as of 2003 approximately 81 percent of adult Batswana are literate.

Services 
The library offers many services including:
 Mobile Library Service
 Postal Service
 Reference Service
 Book Requests Service
 Children's Service
 Computer Training Service
 International Standard Book Number (ISBN)
 Maps

Divisions 
The library currently encompasses many divisions including: 
 Bibliographic Support Services
 National Reference Library
 Public Libraries Division
 Library Service for People with Disabilities
 Projects Research and Publications

Programs 
The library currently offers many programs to its patrons, including: 
 Reading Club
 Homework Assistance
 Youth Computer Training
 Braille
 Annes Stine
 Bana Ba Dinonyane
 Motswedi Rehabilitation Center
 Life-Line
 Storytelling
 Art and Craft
 Health Talk
 Sesigo

See also
 List of national and state libraries
 Botswana National Archives and Records Services

References

Bibliography 
 Margaret Baffour-Awuah, Principal Librarian, Gaborone, Botswana: A Day in Her Life
  (Includes information about the national library)

External links 
 Page on the Ministry of Youth, Sport & Culture
 http://www.sesigo.org.bw/
https://unesdoc.unesco.org/ark:/48223/pf0000089700
https://librarytechnology.org/libraries/search.pl?ILS=Symphony&Country=Botswana

Botswana culture
Botswana
Libraries in Botswana
1968 establishments in Botswana
Libraries established in 1968